A pipkin is an earthenware cooking pot.

Pipkin may also refer to:

People
 Antonio Pipkin (born 1995), Canadian footballer
 E. J. Pipkin (born 1956), American politician
 John Pipkin (born 1967), American author
 Joyce Pipkin (1924–2017), American football player
 Everest Pipkin, American artist
 Marvin Pipkin (1889–1977), American chemist
 Sarah Bedichek Pipkin (1913–1977), American geneticist
 Trea Pipkin (born 1980/1981), American Judge
 Turk Pipkin (born 1952), American actor

Fictional characters 
 Pipkin (Watership Down), from the 1972 novel by Richard Adams
 Andy Pipkin, in the BBC show Little Britain

Other uses
 Pipkin (volcano), a volcano in California
 Pipkin classification, system of categorizing femoral head hip fractures
 Pipkin Rock, island

See also
 Pipkins (disambiguation)
 Pip (nickname)